Chu Văn An (1292–1370, born Chu An) was a Confucian, teacher, physician and high-ranking mandarin of the Trần dynasty in Đại Việt.

Biography 
He was born in Văn Thôn village, Quang Liệt commune, present day Thanh Tri district, Hanoi. In the early life, he was famous as a straightforward man who passed the doctoral examination (Thái Học Sinh / 太學生) but refused to become a mandarin. Instead, An opened a school and began his career as a Confucian teacher in Huỳnh Cung village in Thanh Tri. An's teaching played an important role in spreading Confucianism into a Buddhist Vietnam in this time. 

Under the reign of Tran Minh Tong (1314–1329), he became a teacher at the imperial academy (國子監) where he was responsible for teaching the crown prince Vuong, the future emperor Tran Hien Tong. Under the reign of emperor Tran Du Tong, he was raised to a high-ranking mandarin. 

Later, he resigned and return to his home-village because Tran Du Tong refused his request of beheading seven other mandarins who he accused of corruption. For the rest of his life, An continued his teaching career and wrote books. He died of illness in 1370.

An altar was erected in his honour in the Temple of Literature in Hanoi, where he is still revered.

Petition to behead 7 corrupt officials 
Seven decapitations petition (Chinese: 七斬疏) was a document written by Chu Văn An and presented to King Trần Dụ Tông to propose the beheading of 7 officials he considered corrupt.

Initially, as Dụ Tông was still a little child, the King Father - King Trần Minh Tông - was in charge of the court. After King Trần Minh Tông passed away (in 1357), Dụ Tông Trần Hạo took charge. However, he was incapable of ruling.

During Trần Dụ Tông's reign, the social situation was disturbing. Dụ Tông loved drinking, having fun with pretty women and music. Officials were incompetent, pampering the King so that they could abuse their power. Famine was widespread. The King's loyal and dutiful subjects were killed. The court's historians, whose job was to dissuade the King, tried but Dụ Tông did not listen.

Chu Văn An was a righteous and straightforward official highly respected in the court. He bravely submitted a petition to behead 7 corrupt officials. The petition has been lost thus now its content is unknown. Even at that time though, few people knew who were on his list. Still, the petition shook the country. As the King did not listen to his petition, Chu Văn An resigned and returned to his home village in Phoenix Mountain, Chí Linh, Hải Dương.

See also 
Chu Van An High School (Hanoi)
Chu Van An High School (Ho Chi Minh City)

Notes

External links 

1292 births
1370 deaths
Vietnamese Confucianists
Vietnamese politicians
Trần dynasty officials
Trần dynasty writers
14th-century Vietnamese philosophers